Ploshcha Pyeramohi is a Minsk Metro station. Opened on June 26, 1984.

Photogallery 

Minsk Metro stations
Railway stations opened in 1984